Tornodoxa longiella is a moth in the family Gelechiidae. It was described by Kyu-Tek Park in 1993. It is found in Korea and Japan.

The wingspan is 17–18 mm. The forewings are ochreous, irrorated (sprinkled) with grey. The costal patch is dark brown, trapezoidal and found near the middle of the costa. It is followed by several dark brown greyish-orange fascia. The hindwings are pale grey.

References

Chelariini
Moths described in 1993